NACE may refer to:
 NACE (region), North Atlantic and Central European region
 "Nace" (song), by Colombian pop singer Anasol, 2006
 NACE International, National Association of Corrosion Engineers
 National Association of Colleges and Employers
 National Association of Collegiate Esports
 Statistical Classification of Economic Activities in the European Community – From the French, Nomenclature Statistique des activités économiques dans la Communauté européenne (NACE)